Het 14e kippetje  is a 1998 Dutch film directed by Hany Abu-Assad, the script was written by Arnon Grunberg.  The leading roles were filled by Antonie Kamerling, Thekla Reuten and Dirk Zeelenberg.

Het 14e kippetje was the opening movie at the Nederlands Film festival 1998 in Utrecht and was not a success in cinemas.  29,631 people went to see the movie.

Plot
The movie is about a young couple who are going to marry. Daniel Ackerman (Antonie Kamerling) and Francesca Moorman (Thekla Reuten) are already late for the party at the start of the movie so they have to call a taxi.  They do not know where the agreed restaurant is so they go find someone who knows it.

Meanwhile at the restaurant old friends come back together, Martin Teitel (Dirk Zeelenberg), Harold Cammer (Peter Paul Muller), Philip Berman (Kasper van Kooten) and Alfred Fener (Michael Pas) muse about their memories.

After a while the parents of Francesca (Peer Mascini and Cecile Heuer) and the mother of Daniel (Elsje de Wijn) arrive at the restaurant and a big mess is created when Harold and Mr Moorman start an eating competition.

Around the end of the film Daniel and Francesca successfully arrive at the restaurant "De Tuin van Parijs" (The Garden of Paris) and a showdown happens which will turn the story upside down.

Cast
Antonie Kamerling	... 	Daniel Ackerman
Thekla Reuten	... 	Francesca Moorman
Dirk Zeelenberg	... 	Martin Teitel
Peter Paul Muller	... 	Harold Cammer
Kasper van Kooten	... 	Philip Berman
Michael Pas	... 	Alfred Fener
Peer Mascini	... 	Mr. Moorman
Cecile Heuer	... 	Mrs. Moorman
Elsje de Wijn	... 	Mrs. Ackerman
Victor Löw	... 	Jean
Roos Ouwehand	... 	Aafje
Rifka Lodeizen	... 	Philip Berman's girlfriend
Fabienne de Vries	... 	Waitress ('B-Power')
Frans van Deursen	... 	Taxi driver

References

External links 
 

Dutch romantic comedy-drama films
1998 films
1990s Dutch-language films
Films shot in the Netherlands
Films directed by Hany Abu-Assad